"Lejos De Aquí" is a song by Chilean pop rock band Kudai released in April 1, 2008 as the first single from the group's third studio album, Nadha. The song was written by Koko Stambuk and co-written by Kudai. Produced by Carlos Lara, it features racy lyrics backed with breathy vocals and uptempo beats. Lyrically, it deals with global warming and its future consequences. 

Upon its released, "Lejos De Aquí" received positive critical reviews, and debuted at number third on the Mexican selling singles. Kudai performed this single live with the Mexican band Moderatto on Los Premios MTV Latinoamérica 2008 in October, 2008.

Music video

The accompanying music video was directed by Juan Pablo Olivares, and filmed in San Pedro de Atacama, Chile,. It contains a story of a protection the world of the Global warming, and was premiered on MTV Latin America in April 7, 2008 with an audience of 50 thousand people. The members of Kudai show a futuristic and minimalist style "more defined, more robotic". Pablo Holman looks like an android, Thomas Cañas was stylized in such a way that he looks like a general from the future "with a stronger image, but very human", Bárbara Sepúlveda looks her same image as always but sweeter, and Gabriela Villalba looks more feminine and stronger. 

Music video is very similar to "What I've Done" by Linkin Park, explores the many ironies of humanity and its ill effects on the earth and the environment. It juxtaposes various pieces of footage: a large, well-fed man eating fast food, a woman measuring her waist and a man who is so malnourished that his ribcage is visible through his skin; African Americans being hosed down and the Ku-Klux-Klan; nuclear explosions, children waving American flags, a Middle Eastern child holding an AK-47, clips of oil tankers torn in half and birds covered in an oil slick.

A second version of the video clip was released, showing the World Trade Center towers collapsing on the 9/11 attack.

Track listing and formats
Mexican CD Single
 "Lejos De Aquí" (Radio Version) – 3:38
 "Lejos De Aquí" (Album Version) – 4:17

 Tecktonik Remix
 "Lejos De Aquí" (Tecktonik Remix) – 4:13

Charts

References

2008 singles
Kudai songs
Songs written by Koko Stambuk
2008 songs
EMI Records singles